Sodium hexametaphosphate (SHMP) is a salt of composition Na6[(PO3)6]. Sodium hexametaphosphate of commerce is typically a mixture of  metaphosphates (empirical formula: NaPO3), of which the hexamer is one, and is usually the compound referred to by this name. Such a mixture is more correctly termed sodium polymetaphosphate.  They are white solids that dissolve in water.

Uses
SHMP is used as a sequestrant and has applications within a wide variety of industries, including as a food additive in which it is used under the E number E452i. Sodium carbonate is sometimes added to SHMP to raise the pH to 8.0–8.6, which produces a number of SHMP products used for water softening and detergents.

A significant use for sodium hexametaphosphate is as a deflocculant in the production of clay-based ceramic particles. It is also used as a dispersing agent to break down clay and other soil types for soil texture assessment.

It is used as an active ingredient in toothpastes as an anti-staining and tartar prevention ingredient.

Food additive

As a food additive, SHMP is used as an emulsifier. Artificial maple syrup, canned milk, cheese powders and dips, imitation cheese, whipped topping, packaged egg whites, roast beef, fish fillets, fruit jelly, frozen desserts, salad dressing, herring, breakfast cereal, ice cream, beer, and bottled drinks, among other foods, can contain SHMP.

Water softener salt
SHMP is used in Diamond Crystal brand Bright & Soft Salt Pellets for water softeners in a concentration of 0.03%. It is the only additive other than sodium chloride.

Preparation
SHMP is prepared by heating monosodium orthophosphate to generate sodium acid pyrophosphate:

2 NaH2PO4 → Na2H2P2O7 + H2O

Subsequently, the pyrophosphate is heated to give the corresponding sodium hexametaphosphate:

3 Na2H2P2O7 → (NaPO3)6 + 3 H2O

followed by rapid cooling.

Reactions
SHMP hydrolyzes in aqueous solution, particularly under acidic conditions, to sodium trimetaphosphate and sodium orthophosphate.

History 

Hexametaphosphoric acid was named in 1849 by the German chemist Theodor Fleitmann.  By 1956, chromatographic analysis of hydrolysates of Graham's salt (sodium polyphosphate) indicated the presence of cyclic anions containing more than four phosphate groups; these findings were confirmed in 1961. In 1963, the German chemists Erich Thilo and Ulrich Schülke succeeded in preparing sodium hexametaphosphate by heating anhydrous sodium trimetaphosphate.

Safety
Sodium phosphates are recognized to have low acute oral toxicity. SHMP concentrations not exceeding 10,000mg/L or mg/kg are considered protective levels by the EFSA and USFDA. Extreme concentrations of this salt may cause acute side effects from excessive blood serum concentrations of sodium, such as: “irregular pulse, bradycardia, and hypocalcemia."

References

External links
Occupational Health and Safety Agency for Healthcare in British Columbia
Material Safety Data Sheet

Sodium compounds
Metaphosphates
Water treatment
Photographic chemicals
Glass compositions